Joey DeAnn Cook (born March 30, 1991) is an American singer-songwriter from Woodbridge, Virginia who finished seventh place on the fourteenth season of American Idol. She toured with indie rock band Mammoth Indigo in 2013.

Early life
Joey Cook was born on March 30, 1991, and was raised in Woodbridge, Virginia. She began playing piano and singing at the age of five. In high school, she participated in choir and taught herself to play ukulele and guitar. Cook graduated from Woodbridge High School in 2009.

American Idol

Cook auditioned in Kansas City, singing "King of Spain" by The Tallest Man on Earth. She sang "Kerosene" on the first round in Hollywood, and "Across the Universe" in the final solo of the Hollywood Round.

 Due to the judges using their one save on Qaasim Middleton, the top 11 remained intact for another week.

Other works
Postmodern Jukebox released "Hey There Delilah" on August 27, 2015, "Sugar, We're Goin Down" on October 1, 2015, "Say My Name" on November 26, 2015, and "Ain't No Rest for the Wicked" on January 7, 2017, with Cook on lead vocals.

Cook's first album, Hey, I Love You, was self-published on Bandcamp in 2012.

Under the name Joey Cook and the Partyraddlers, her album Welcome to the Variety Show was released on July 1, 2016.

Personal life
After finishing 7th place on American Idol, Joey toured internationally with the jazz band 'Postmodern Jukebox'. She is now currently releasing original music & producing for up 
& coming Artists.

Discography
 Hey, I Love You (2012)  
 Welcome to the Variety Show (2016)

References

American Idol participants
1991 births
21st-century American singers
Living people
People from Woodbridge, Virginia
Singers from Virginia
21st-century American women singers